Events from the year 1924 in Argentina

Incumbents
 President: Marcelo Torcuato de Alvear
 Vice President: Elpidio González

Governors
 Buenos Aires Province: José Luis Cantilo 
 Cordoba: Julio A. Roca, Jr. 
 Mendoza Province: Carlos Washington Lencinas (until 9 October); Enrique Mosca (from 9 October)

Vice Governors
 Buenos Aires Province: Pedro Solanet

Events
March 7 – 1924 Argentine legislative election
July 19 – Napalpí massacre

Births
April 24 – Nahuel Moreno, Trotskyist leader (died 1987)
June 11 – Jovita Luna, singer and actress (died 2006)
June 21 – Ricardo Infante, footballer and manager (died 2008)
August 22 – Orlando Ramón Agosti, Argentine general (died 1997)
August 29 – María Dolores Pradera, singer and actress (died 2008)
November 21 – Víctor Hipólito Martínez, lawyer and politician (died 2017)

Deaths
December 6 - Aurelia Vélez Sársfield, writer (born 1836) 
date unknown - Juan Argerich, writer (born 1862)

See also
List of Argentine films of 1924

References 

 
Years of the 20th century in Argentina